The North Riding of Lindsey was a division of the Lindsey part of Lincolnshire in England.  It consisted of the north-eastern part of the county, and included the Bradley-Haverstoe, Ludborough, Walshcroft and Yarborough wapentakes.

Former subdivisions of Lincolnshire
Parts of Lindsey